Robert Morris Yost (born 1917, died 2006) was a philosopher at the University of California in Los Angeles (UCLA). UCLA offers the Robert M. Yost Prize in philosophy in honor of his notable achievements in the field.

References

University of California, Los Angeles faculty
20th-century American philosophers

1917 births
2006 deaths